Damianos Giallourakis (born 15 October 1986) is a Greek professional pool player from the island of Rhodes and lives in Oslo. He is best known as the 'Jump Master' of the pool world. He is a regular player on the Euro Tour, winning his first medal at the 2019 Austria Open, reaching the semi-final before losing 9–6 to Joshua Filler.

References

External links

Greek pool players
1986 births
Living people
People from Rhodes
Sportspeople from the South Aegean